Homestake Mine is located in the Newberry Mountains near Searchlight, Nevada.   It is listed on the United States National Register of Historic Places for activities between 1850 and 1924.  Gold and silver were mined.

History 
The mine operated from the 1930s to 1953 and tapped the Silver King Vein.

The site was listed on the National Register of Historic Places on July 17, 1985.

References 

National Register of Historic Places in Clark County, Nevada
Gold mines in Nevada
Silver mining in Nevada
Silver mines in the United States
Underground mines in the United States
Industrial buildings and structures on the National Register of Historic Places in Nevada
Historic districts on the National Register of Historic Places in Nevada